Lisbon Maru was a Japanese cargo liner built at Yokohama in 1920 for a Japanese shipping line. During World War II, the ship was turned into an armed troopship. On her final voyage, Lisbon Maru was being used to transport prisoners of war between Hong Kong and Japan when it was torpedoed on 1 October 1942, sinking with a loss of over 800 British lives.

Construction and commercial service
Lisbon Maru was completed on 8 July 1920 at the Yokohama Dock Company shipyard in Yokohama, Japan as Yard No. 70, entering service for a major Japanese shipping line, Nippon Yusen Kabushiki Kaisha, and registered at the port of Tokyo.

It measured  and 4,308 NRT. The engines and four boilers were made by the shipbuilder.

Sinking
On her final voyage, the Lisbon Maru was carrying 700 Japanese Army personnel and 1,816 British prisoners of war captured after the Battle of Hong Kong in December 1941. The POWs were held in "appalling conditions ... [those] at the bottom of the hold ... showered by the diarrhea of sick soldiers above".

On 1 October 1942, the ship was torpedoed by the submarine  while travelling through the South China Sea. The Japanese troops were evacuated from the ship but the POWs were not; instead the hatches were battened down above them and they were left on the listing ship. After 24 hours, as it became apparent that the ship was sinking, the POWs were able to break through the hatch covers. Some were able to escape from the ship before it sank. The ladder from one of the holds to the deck failed, and the Royal Artillery POWs in the hold could not escape; they were last heard singing "It's a Long Way to Tipperary". Survivors reported that Japanese guards first fired on the POWs who reached the deck; and that other Japanese ships used machine guns to fire at POWs who were in the water. Later, however, after some Chinese fishermen started rescuing survivors, the Japanese ships also rescued survivors.

The British government insisted that over 800 of these men died either directly as a result of the sinking, or from being shot or otherwise killed by the Japanese while swimming away from the wreck. The ship was not marked to alert Allied forces to the nature of its passengers. The Japanese government insisted that British prisoners were in fact not deliberately killed by Japanese soldiers and criticised the British statement.

Aftermath
A Lisbon Maru memorial was placed in the chapel of Stanley Fort, Hong Kong. It was moved to the chapel of St. Stephen's College, Hong Kong with Hong Kong's change in sovereignty.

A reunion of Lisbon Maru survivors was held on board  on 2 October 2007 to mark the 65th anniversary of their escape. Six former prisoners attended, alongside many families of the escapees.

In popular culture
 The album Tarot Sport by the British electronic band Fuck Buttons features a track named The Lisbon Maru. Band member Benjamin John Power's grandfather survived the torpedoing of the ship.

See also
 List by death toll of ships sunk by submarines

References

Further reading
 Major (Ret'd) Brian Finch, MCIL, "A Faithful Record of the 'Lisbon Maru' Incident" (translation from Chinese with additional material) published by Proverse Hong Kong, in the Royal Asiatic Society Hong Kong Studies Series, 2017.

External links
 The fall of Hong Kong which led to transportation of prisoners on the Lisbon Maru
 The full roll of those who perished on the Lisbon Maru
 Sinking of Lisbon Maru
 Time to Unseal the Lison Maru Incident, an incomplete documentation of the rescue effort made by local Chinese fishermen
 IWM Interview with survivor George Bainborough
 IWM Interview with survivor Jack Hughieson
 IWM Interview with survivor Charles Jordan
 IMW Interview with survivor Andrew Salmon
 IWM Interview with survivor Montague Truscott
 IWM Interview with survivor Alf Shepherd

1920 ships
Cargo ships
Maritime incidents in October 1942
Ships sunk by American submarines
Troop ships
World War II shipwrecks in the East China Sea
Japanese hell ships
British World War II prisoners of war
Military history of Canada during World War II